The phylum Elusimicrobiota, previously known as "Termite Group 1", has been shown to be widespread in different ecosystems like marine environment, sewage sludge, contaminated sites and soils, and toxic wastes. The high abundance of Elusimicrobiota representatives is only seen for the lineage of symbionts found in termites and ants.

The first organism to be cultured was Elusimicrobium minutum; however, two other species have been partially described and placed in a separate class, known as Endomicrobia.

Phylogeny

Taxonomy
The currently accepted taxonomy is based solemnly on the List of Prokaryotic names with Standing in Nomenclature (LPSN)  and National Center for Biotechnology Information (NCBI)

 Phylum Elusimicrobiota Geissinger et al. 2021
 Class "Elusimicrobiia" Oren, Parte & Garrity 2016 ex Cavalier-Smith 2020 [Elusimicrobia Geissinger et al. 2010]
 Order Elusimicrobiales Geissinger et al. 2010
 Family Elusimicrobiaceae Geissinger et al. 2010
 Genus "Ca. Avelusimicrobium" Gilroy et al. 2021
 Species "Ca. A. excrementipullorum" Gilroy et al. 2021
 Genus Elusimicrobium Geissinger et al. 2010
 Species E. minutum Geissinger et al. 2010
 Class Endomicrobia (sic) Zheng et al. 2018
 Order Endomicrobiales Zheng et al. 2018
 Family Endomicrobiaceae Zheng et al. 2018
 Genus Endomicrobium Zheng et al. 2018
 Species E. proavitum Zheng et al. 2018
 Species "Ca. E. pyrsonymphae" Stingl et al. 2005
 Species "Ca. E. superficiale" Izawa et al. 2017
 Species "Ca. E. trichonymphae" Stingl et al. 2005

See also
 List of bacterial orders
 List of bacteria genera

References 

Bacteria phyla